Nand Kumar is a Pakistani politician who had been a Member of the Provincial Assembly of Sindh, from June 2013 to May 2018.

In 2018, he proposed amendment to the Sindh Hindu marriage act to add divorce and remarriage rights for Hindu couples which was passed.

Early life and education
He was born on 6 July 1967 in Sanghar.

He has a degree of Bachelor of Arts which he received from G.D.P.S.S. College, Sanghar. He also has done Master of Arts in Economics and Bachelor of Laws, both from University of Sindh.

Political career

He was elected to the Provincial Assembly of Sindh as a candidate of Pakistan Muslim League (F) on reserved seat for minorities in 2013 Pakistani general election.

References

Living people
Sindh MPAs 2013–2018
1967 births
Pakistan Muslim League (F) politicians
Grand Democratic Alliance MPAs (Sindh)